Kim Waters (born March 20, 1965) is an American  jazz artist born in Havre de Grace, Maryland.

Early life
Waters grew up in Harford County, Maryland. Waters learned how to play the saxophone at a young age. He attended C. Milton Wright High School. He played on the basketball team and was a shooting guard. Waters and his brothers formed a band early in their career.

Career

Early career
In 1989 Waters debuted with his album, Sweet and Saxy. In 1991 his album Sax Appeal was released and in 1993 his album Peaceful Journey. In 1994, It’s Time for Love was released.

Shanachie Records (1997-2013) 
In 1998, Waters released his first album under Shanachie Records, Love's Melody. He released several albums under Shanachie Records including In the Name of Love and You Are My Lady.

Red River Entertainment (2013-2016) 
In 2013 Waters released his album, My Loves, under Red River Entertainment. The album also had appearances from Glenn Jones and Waters’ wife, Dana Pope. In his next album, Silver Soul, Waters had appearances from Zendaya and Eric Roberson.

Shanachie Records (2016-present) 
In 2016 Waters returned to Shanachie Records with his album, Rhythm and Romance. The album peaked at number 12 on Jazz Album charts.

The Sax Pack 
In 2008, Kim Waters, Jeff Kashiwa, and Steve Cole formed The Sax Pack. Their debut album, The Sax Pack, was released in 2008 under Shanachie Records. The album peaked at number 13 on the Billboard charts. In 2009, the album, The Pack is Back, was released and peaked at number 16 on Billboard Charts. In 2012, Kim Waters was replaced by  Marcus Anderson in the touring band.  In 2015, The Power of 3 was released with Kim Waters appearing again on the studio release.

Discography

Solo albums 
 1989 Sweet and Saxy
 1990 All Because of You 
 1991 Sax Appeal 
 1992 Tribute 
 1993 Peaceful Journey
 1994 It's Time for Love 
 1994 Home for Christmas 
 1996 You Are Not Alone 
 1998 Love's Melody 
 1999 One Special Moment
 2001 From the Heart 
 2002 Someone to Love You 
 2004 In the Name of Love 
 2005 All for Love 
 2007 You Are My Lady
 2008 I Want You: Love in the Spirit of Marvin Gaye 
 2010 Love Stories
 2011 This Heart of Mine 
 2013 My Loves 
 2014 Silver Soul
 2015 My Gift to You
 2016 Rhythm with Romance 
 2018 What I Like 
 2020 Shakedown
 2022 That Special Touch

Albums with Sax Pack 
 2008 The Sax Pack 
 2009 The Pack is Back!
 2015 Power of 3

References

Living people
1965 births
People from Havre de Grace, Maryland
Jazz musicians from Maryland
American saxophonists